Pat Boone Sings is the second greatest-hits album by Pat Boone. It was released in 1959 on Dot Records.

Track listing

References 

1959 compilation albums
Pat Boone albums
Dot Records compilation albums